The Australian anchovy, Engraulis australis, is a species of anchovy of the family Engraulidae, found off south-east Australia, and around New Zealand.

The Australian anchovy feeds on plankton and is of minor importance to commercial fisheries. It is usually utilized as bait.

References
 
 
 Tony Ayling & Geoffrey Cox, Collins Guide to the Sea Fishes of New Zealand,  (William Collins Publishers Ltd, Auckland, New Zealand 1982) 

Engraulis
Fish of Australia
Fish of the Pacific Ocean
Fish described in 1790